Harlaxton is a locality in the Toowoomba Region, Queensland, Australia. Traditionally a rural area, most of the locality is now residential.

Geography

Willowburn railway station is part of a large railway marshalling yard accessed via Davidson Street.

History 
The locality's name originates from Harlaxton House, probably named for Harlaxton in Lincolnshire, England, and built in 1869 in what is now Munro Street as the residence of Francis Thomas Gregory. Gregory was an explorer in Western Australia, before moving to Queensland in 1862, serving as Commissioner of Crown Lands and an appointed Member of the Queensland Legislative Council from 1874 until his death in 1888. The home was later used as the summer residence for Lord Lamington who served as Governor of Queensland from 1896 until 1901. Harlaxton railway station on the Main line railway was built nearby for his convenience. The house is in a deteriorating condition, partly due to blasts from the neighbouring quarries.

Harlaxton State School opened on 2 September 1901.

View Glen State School opened on 25 May 1914 and closed in 1924.

Downlands Sacred Heart College was established on 1 March 1931 by the Missionaries of the Sacred Heart as a boarding school for boys. The school had an initial enrolment of 68 students. In 1971 the school accepted day students, both boys and girls. From 1993 girls were also accepted as boarders, enabling siblings to attend the same school.

Holy Trinity Anglican Church was dedicated on 2 October 1966 by Archbishop Phillip Strong. It closed circa 1982.

Harlaxton is the most socio-economically disadvantaged suburb in Toowoomba; at the 2006 census, residents had a median individual income of $366, compared with $448 for the Toowoomba statistical district, and a median family income of $881 compared to $1,116. The suburb had a SEIFA score of 903, placing it below all other suburbs in the district.

Aboriginal and Torres Strait Islander people made up 7.2% of the population. 81.1% of people were born in Australia. 86.9% of people spoke only English at home. The most common responses for religion were No Religion  24.9%, Catholic 21.3% and Anglican 15.6%.

Heritage listings
Harlaxton has a number of heritage-listed sites, including:
 6 Munro Street: Harlaxton House
 Ruthven Street within the grounds of Downlands College: Tyson Manor

Economy 
Harlaxton has a history as an industrial centre. Apart from the quarries, the suburb is home to the Willowburn railway marshalling yard and the original Darling Downs Bacon Company established as a co-operative in 1911 (later KR Castlemaine).

Education 
Harlaxton State School is a government primary (Prep-6) school for boys and girls at 110 Ruthven Street. In 2017, the school had an enrollment of 130 students with 13 teachers (11 full-time equivalent) and 19 non-teaching staff (10 full-time equivalent).

Downlands College is a Catholic primary and secondary (5–12) day and boarding school for boys and girls at 72 Ruthven Street. In 2017, the school had an enrollment of 770 students with 70 teachers (68 full-time equivalent) and 49 non-teaching staff (35 full-time equivalent).

Amenities
Harlaxton is also home to the Toowoomba Cricket Club and the Toowoomba Bears rugby union club, as well as the Willowburn Sports Club (soccer).

Politics
In the 2004 federal election and again in the 2010 election, the booth at Harlaxton North was the only booth in the Division of Groom to record a Labor two-party preferred majority.

References

External links

 

Suburbs of Toowoomba
Toowoomba Region
Localities in Queensland